Sue Grace (born January 31, 1958) is a former member of the Arizona House of Representatives and the Arizona State Senate. She served in the house from January 1991 through January 1997, and then in the Senate from January 1997 through January 2001.

References

1958 births
Living people
Politicians from Milwaukee
Politicians from Phoenix, Arizona
Women state legislators in Arizona
Republican Party members of the Arizona House of Representatives
Republican Party Arizona state senators
21st-century American women politicians
21st-century American politicians